Fannegusha Creek is a stream in the U.S. state of Mississippi. It is a tributary to the Pearl River.

Fannegusha is a name derived from the Choctaw language purported to mean "tasty squirrel".

References

Rivers of Mississippi
Rivers of Rankin County, Mississippi
Rivers of Scott County, Mississippi
Tributaries of the Pearl River (Mississippi–Louisiana)
Mississippi placenames of Native American origin